Derealization is an alteration in the perception of the external world, causing those with the condition to perceive it as unreal, distant, distorted or falsified. Other symptoms include feeling as if one's environment is lacking in spontaneity, emotional coloring, and depth. It is a dissociative symptom that may appear in moments of severe stress.

Derealization is a subjective experience pertaining to a person's perception of the outside world, while depersonalization is a related symptom characterized by dissociation towards one's own body and mental processes. The two are commonly experienced in conjunction with one another, but are also known to occur independently.

Chronic derealization is fairly rare, and may be caused by occipital–temporal dysfunction. Experiencing derealization for long periods of time or having recurring episodes can be indicative of many psychological disorders, and can cause significant distress. However, temporary derealization symptoms are commonly experienced by the general population a few times throughout their lives, with a lifetime prevalence of up to 26–74% and a prevalence of 31–66% at the time of a traumatic event.

Description
The experience of derealization can be described as an immaterial substance that separates a person from the outside world, such as a sensory fog, pane of glass, or veil. Individuals may report that what they see lacks vividness and emotional coloring. Emotional response to visual recognition of loved ones may be significantly reduced. Feelings of déjà vu or jamais vu are common. Familiar places may look alien, bizarre, and surreal. One may not even be sure whether what one perceives is in fact reality or not. The world as perceived by the individual may feel as if it were going through a dolly zoom effect. Such perceptual abnormalities may also extend to the senses of hearing, taste, and smell.

The degree of familiarity one has with their surroundings is among one's sensory and psychological identity, memory foundation and history when experiencing a place. When persons are in a state of derealization, they block this identifying foundation from recall. This "blocking effect" creates a discrepancy of correlation between one's perception of one's surroundings during a derealization episode, and what that same individual would perceive in the absence of a derealization episode.

Frequently, derealization occurs in the context of constant worrying or "intrusive thoughts" that one finds hard to switch off. In such cases it can build unnoticed along with the underlying anxiety attached to these disturbing thoughts, and be recognized only in the aftermath of a realization of crisis, often a panic attack, subsequently seeming difficult or impossible to ignore. This type of anxiety can be crippling to the affected and may lead to avoidant behavior. Those who experience this phenomenon may feel concern over the cause of their derealization. It is often difficult to accept that such a disturbing symptom is simply a result of anxiety, and the individual may often think that the cause must be something more serious. This can, in turn, cause more anxiety and worsen the derealization. Derealization also has been shown to interfere with the learning process, with cognitive impairments demonstrated in immediate recall and visuospatial deficits. This can be best understood as the individual feeling as if they see the events in third person.

Causes 
Derealization can accompany the neurological conditions of epilepsy (particularly temporal lobe epilepsy), migraine, and mild TBI (head injury). There is a similarity between visual hypo-emotionality, a reduced emotional response to viewed objects, and derealization. This suggests a disruption of the process by which perception becomes emotionally colored. This qualitative change in the experiencing of perception may lead to reports of anything viewed being unreal or detached.

The instances of recurring or chronic derealization among those who have experienced extreme trauma and/or have post-traumatic stress (PTSD) have been studied closely in many scientific studies, whose results indicate a strong link between the disorders, with a disproportionate amount of post traumatic stress patients reporting recurring feelings of derealization and depersonalization (up to 30% of those with the condition) in comparison to the general populace (only around 2%), especially in those who experienced the trauma in childhood. Many possibilities have been suggested by various psychologists to help explain these findings, the most widely accepted including that experiencing trauma can cause individuals to distance themselves from their surroundings and perception, with the aim of subsequently distancing themselves from the trauma and (especially in the case of depersonalisation) their emotional response to it. This could be either as a deliberate coping mechanism or an involuntary, reflexive response depending on circumstance. This possibly not only increases the risk of experiencing problems with derealization and its corresponding disorder, but with all relevant dissociative disorders. In the case of childhood trauma, not only are children more likely to be susceptible to such a response as they are less able to implement more healthy strategies to deal with the emotional implications of experiencing trauma, there is also a lot of evidence that shows trauma can have a substantial detrimental effect on learning and development, especially since those who experience trauma in childhood are far less likely to have received adequate parenting. These are factors proven to increase susceptibility to maladaptive psychological conditions, which of course includes dissociative disorders and subsequently derealization symptoms.

Some neurophysiological studies have noted disturbances arising from the frontal-temporal cortex, which could explain the correlation found between derealization symptoms and temporal lobe disorders. This is further supported by reports of people with frontal lobe epilepsy, with those with epilepsy of the dorsal premotor cortex reporting symptoms of depersonalization, while those with temporal lobe epilepsy reported experiencing derealization symptoms. This implies that malfunction of these specific brain regions may be the cause of these dissociative symptoms, or at the very least that these brain regions are heavily involved.

Derealization can possibly manifest as an indirect result of certain vestibular disorders such as labyrinthitis. This is thought to result from anxiety stemming from being dizzy.
An alternative explanation holds that a possible effect of vestibular dysfunction includes responses in the form of the modulation of noradrenergic and serotonergic activity due to a misattribution of vestibular symptoms to the presence of imminent physical danger resulting in the experience of anxiety or panic, which subsequently generate feelings of derealization. Likewise, derealization is a common psychosomatic symptom seen in various anxiety disorders, especially hypochondria. However, derealization is presently regarded as a separate psychological issue due to its presence as a symptom within several pathologies.

Derealization and dissociative symptoms have been linked by some studies to various physiological and psychological differences in individuals and their environments. It was remarked that labile sleep-wake cycles (labile meaning more easily roused) with some distinct changes in sleep, such as dream-like states, hypnogogic, hypnopompic hallucinations, night-terrors and other disorders related to sleep could possibly be causative or improve symptoms to a degree. Derealization can also be a symptom of severe sleep disorders and mental disorders like depersonalization disorder, borderline personality disorder, bipolar disorder, schizophrenia, dissociative identity disorder, and other mental conditions.

Cannabis, psychedelics, dissociatives, antidepressants, caffeine, nitrous oxide, albuterol, and nicotine can all produce feelings of derealization, or sensations mimicking them, particularly when taken in excess. It can also result from alcohol withdrawal or benzodiazepine withdrawal. Tramadol withdrawal can also cause feelings of derealization, often alongside psychotic symptoms such as anxiety, paranoia and hallucinations.

Interoceptive exposure exercises have been used in research settings as a means to induce derealization, as well as the related phenomenon depersonalization, in people who are sensitive to high levels of anxiety. Exercises with documented successes include timed intervals of hyperventilation or staring at a mirror, dot, or spiral.

Popular culture 
Derealization, as a concept, is referenced in the 2021 comedy special by Bo Burnham called Bo Burnham: Inside; specifically, it is mentioned in the song "That Funny Feeling" in which derealization is showcased as a central theme.

See also

References 

Neurology
Dissociative disorders